Zhang Jiaxin (born 1 November 1995) is a Chinese footballer who plays as a right-back for Qingdao Hainiu.

Career statistics

Club

Notes

References

1995 births
Living people
Chinese footballers
Association football defenders
Campeonato de Portugal (league) players
China League One players
China League Two players
Shanghai Port F.C. players
FC Jumilla players
G.D. Gafanha players
Shanghai Shenxin F.C. players
Chinese expatriate footballers
Chinese expatriate sportspeople in Spain
Expatriate footballers in Spain
Chinese expatriate sportspeople in Portugal
Expatriate footballers in Portugal